Wang Seok-hyeon (born June 2, 2003) is a South Korean actor. He is known for his role in the 2008 film Scandal Makers.

Filmography

Film

Television series

Variety show

Awards and nominations

References

External links

2003 births
Living people
South Korean male television actors
South Korean male film actors
South Korean male musical theatre actors
South Korean male child actors
21st-century South Korean male actors